Zainizam Marjan (born 11 May 1980) is a Malaysian footballer who was a midfielder for Sabah FA in the Malaysia Premier League. He is a former member of Malaysia national football team and the younger brother of Sabah and Malaysia top striker during the 1990s, Matlan Marjan.

Career
Zainizam started his football career with Sabah during the 2002 season. He scored 11 goals in 24 matches during the 2002 season to help Sabah clinch third place in the Malaysia Premier I League. He also helped Sabah to reach the finals of the 2002 Malaysia Cup scoring six goals.

Allan Harris, the national team coach at that time, took him into the national senior team. He then made his international debut against Myanmar on 17 May 2002. He was also featured in the match against Brazil and was part of the Malaysia under-23 2002 Asian Games squad. He was also part of the 2002 Tiger Cup squad.

During 2003, he helped Sabah to finish fourth in the Malaysia Premier I League scoring four goals. He then helped Sabah qualify to the final of Malaysia Cup for the second time, eventually losing to Selangor MPPJ by 3–0.

After that, Zainizam was called up by Allan Harris to represent the Malaysia under-23 side for the 2003 SEA Games. He managed to score 1 goal in the Malaysia 3-4 defeat to host Vietnam. The  SEA Games was his last appearances for the national team.

Since joining Sabah in 2000, Zainizam has 62 goals for Sabah. This makes him the second overall top scorer behind Scott Ollerenshaw.

In 2014, Sabah FA officially released him from the current squad.

International goals

Honours

Sabah
Malaysia Cup: runner-up 2002, 2003

Malaysia
 SEA Games:  Bronze 2003

References

External links
 Sabah FA squad for 2007/08 Malaysia Premier League

1980 births
Living people
Malaysian footballers
Malaysia international footballers
People from Sabah
Bajau people
Sabah F.C. (Malaysia) players
Footballers at the 2002 Asian Games
Southeast Asian Games bronze medalists for Malaysia
Southeast Asian Games medalists in football
Association football forwards
People from Kota Belud District
Competitors at the 2003 Southeast Asian Games
Asian Games competitors for Malaysia